The Marcus Whitman Central School District is a school district in Rushville, New York, United States, and served Rushville, Middlesex, and Gorham. The superintendent is Dr. Christopher Brown. The district operates four schools: Marcus Whitman High School, Marcus Whitman Middle School, Gorham Elementary School, and Middlesex Valley Elementary School.

Administration 
The district offices are located at 4100 Baldwin Road in Rushville. The current superintendent is Dr. Christopher Brown.

Selected Former Superintendents 
Previous assignment and reason for departure denoted in parentheses
Richard A. Conover–?-1969 (Unknown, named Superintendent of Waterloo Central School District)
William VanLare
Charles R. Wiltse–?-2002 (Unknown, retired)
Keith R. Eddinger–2002-2005 (Principal - Marcus Whitman Middle School, retired)
Oren Cook–2005-2008 (Superintendent - Adriondack Central School, took leave of absence)
Michael A. Chirco–2008-2013 (Interim Assistant Superintendent for Instructional Services - Marcus Whitman Central School District, retired)
Jeramy M. Clingerman–2013-2019 (Principal - Waterloo High School, named Superintendent of Seneca Falls Central School District)

Marcus Whitman High School 

Marcus Whitman High School is located at 4100 Baldwin Road, in Rushville and serves grades 9 through 12. The current principal is Eric Pasho.

History

Selected former principals 
Previous assignment and reason for departure denoted in parentheses
Mr. Howard Shanklin–1968–1973 (unknown, named Curriculum Coordinator for Marcus Whitman Central Schools)
Mr. Ronald A. Davis–1973–1991 (Vice Principal - Marcus Whitman High School, retired)
Mr. Dean T. Duffy–1991–2001 (Vice Principal - Marcus Whitman High School, retired)
Ms. Lynn Muscarella–2001-2004 (Unknown, named Principal of Oakfield Middle/High School)
Dr. Susan H. Wissick–2004-2006 (Unknown, named Principal of Middlesex Valley Elementary School)
Mr. Mark D. Sissell–2006-2008 (Principal - Campbell-Savona High School, named Superintendent of Westfield Academy and Central School)
Mr. Alan R. DeGroote–2008–2012 (Principal - Marcus Whitman Middle School, retired)

Marcus Whitman Middle School 

Marcus Whitman Middle School is located at 4100 Baldwin Road in Rushville and serves grades 6 through 8. The current principal is Eric Pasho.

History

Selected former principals 
Previous assignment and reason for departure denoted in parentheses
James Boyle
Henry McDougal
Keith Eddinger–?-2002 (Guidance Counselor - Marcus Whitman High School, named Superintendent of Marcus Whitman Central District)
William W. Rotenberg–2002-2004 (Vice Principal - Midlakes High School, named Principal of North Rose-Wolcott High School)
Alan Degroote–2004-2007 (Social Studies teacher - Marcus Whitman High School, named Principal of Marcus Whitman High School)

Gorham Intermediate School 

Gorham Intermediate School is located at 2705 Route 245 in Stanley, New York and serves grades 3 through 5. The current principal is Jenn Taft.

History

Selected former principals
Previous assignment and reason for departure denoted in parentheses
Eric Young
Jacquelyn Metz–?-2004 (Unknown, retired)
Michael L. Pullen–2004-2007 (Fourth Grade teacher - East Rochester Elementary School), named Principal of Ontario Elementary School)
Paul J. Lahue–2007-2012 (Principal - Middlesex Valley Elementary, returned to Middlesex)

Middlesex Valley Primary School 

Middlesex Valley Primary School is located at 149 State Route 245 in Rushville and serves Grades UPK–2. The current principal is Dr. Bonnie Cazer.

History

Selected former principals 
Ralph Casperson
Cynthia Martone
Paul Lahue–2004-2006 (Teacher - Middlesex Valley Elementary School, named Principal of Gorham Elementary School)
Susan Wissick–2006-2012 (Principal - Marcus Whitman High School, named Principal of Gorham Elementary)
Paul Lahue–2012-2014 (Principal - Gorham Elementary School, named Director of Athletics for Marcus Whitman Central School District)

Administration

References

External links
Official site

School districts in New York (state)
Education in Ontario County, New York